The eighth season of Dynasty originally aired in the United States on ABC from September 23, 1987 through March 30, 1988. The series, created by Richard and Esther Shapiro and produced by Aaron Spelling, revolves around the Carringtons, a wealthy family residing in Denver, Colorado.

Season eight stars John Forsythe as millionaire oil magnate Blake Carrington; Linda Evans as his wife Krystle; Jack Coleman as Blake and Alexis's earnest son Steven; Gordon Thomson as Blake and Alexis's eldest son Adam; Emma Samms as Blake and Alexis's daughter Fallon; John James as Fallon's ex-husband Jeff Colby; Leann Hunley as Adam's wife Dana Waring; Heather Locklear as Krystle's niece and Steven's ex-wife Sammy Jo; Michael Nader as Alexis's ex-husband Dex Dexter; James Healey as Alexis's mysterious new husband Sean Rowan; Terri Garber as Blake's niece Leslie Carrington; and Joan Collins as Alexis Colby, Blake's ex-wife and the mother of Adam, Fallon, Steven, and Amanda.

Development
With The Colbys cancelled, John James and Emma Samms returned as Jeff and Fallon for Dynasty eighth season. By the end of the season, Dynasty had dropped out of the top 30, and was ranked #41 in the United States. The season finale episode "Colorado Roulette" was the last episode of the series to air on a Wednesday, and the show moved to Thursdays for season nine.

Plot
Jeff and Fallon return to Denver, their marriage falling apart again. Matthew, returned from the dead but troubled by headaches, holds the Carringtons hostage in hopes that Krystle will run away with him. Steven ends the siege by reluctantly stabbing his old friend to death. Alexis is saved by a handsome, mysterious stranger, Sean Rowan. She later marries him, not realizing that he is the son of deceased Carrington majordomo Joseph Anders, bent on revenge on behalf of his father and sister, Kirby. Steven and Sammy Jo's reconciliation is short-lived, and the pursuit of a child unravels Adam and Dana's marriage. Sean begins to manipulate and destroy the Carringtons from the inside, and he fights Dex to the death in the March 30, 1988 season finale. Blake, who failed being elected as governor of Colorado, comes home to find Krystle missing and their bedroom in shambles.

Cast

Main

John Forsythe as Blake Carrington
Linda Evans as Krystle Carrington
John James as Jeff Colby
Gordon Thomson as Adam Carrington
Jack Coleman as Steven Carrington
Michael Nader as Dex Dexter
Heather Locklear as Sammy Jo Carrington
Emma Samms as Fallon Carrington Colby
Terri Garber as Leslie Carrington
 Leann Hunley as Dana Waring
 James Healey as Sean Rowan
Bo Hopkins as Matthew Blaisdel
Joan Collins as Alexis Carrington

Recurring

 Stephanie Dunnam as Karen Atkinson
William Beckley as Gerard
Tom Schanley as Josh Harris
Christopher Allport as Jesse Atkinson
Virginia Hawkins as Jeanette Robbins
Daniel Davis as Harry Thresher
Hank Brandt as Morgan Hess

Notable guest stars

Betty Harford as Hilda Gunnerson
Grant Goodeve as Chris Deegan
Paul Burke as Neal McVane
James Sutorious as Gordon Wales

Cast notes

Episodes

Reception
In season eight, Dynasty was ranked #41 in the United States with a 14.3 Nielsen rating.

References

External links
 

1987 American television seasons
1988 American television seasons
Dynasty (1981 TV series) seasons